Taylor Heinicke (born March 15, 1993) is an American football quarterback for the Atlanta Falcons of the National Football League (NFL). He played college football at Old Dominion and signed with the Minnesota Vikings as an undrafted free agent in 2015. Heinicke has also been a member of the New England Patriots, Houston Texans, Carolina Panthers, and Washington Football Team / Commanders, as well as the St. Louis BattleHawks in the XFL.

With Washington in 2020, Heinicke filled in for an injured Alex Smith in a playoff game against the Tampa Bay Buccaneers. He later started the majority of the 2021 season following an injury to Ryan Fitzpatrick, setting the NFL record for the most completions by a quarterback in his first three starts in NFL history. Heinicke also started the majority of the 2022 season, after an injury to Carson Wentz. Heinicke has been cited as an underdog by teammates, fans, and the media due to his ability to lead teams to wins despite a perceived lack of size and natural arm talent.

High school career
Heinicke played football under head coach Kevin Reach at Collins Hill High School in Lawrenceville, Georgia, where he was an all-state selection as a junior after guiding Collins Hill to a 10–4 record and a trip to the Class AAAAA semi-finals. As a senior, Heinicke was named the Old Spice National Player of the Year in the state of Georgia. The award is presented annually to 50 high school varsity football athletes. He was also the Gwinnett Daily Post Offensive Player of the Year after his record season when he threw for 4,218 yards, the second most in state history, and 44 touchdowns, which is the third-best ever in Georgia, setting Gwinnett County single-season records for passing yards and touchdowns. He threw over 300 yards in nine games and also ran for 354 yards on 77 carries along with a pair of touchdowns. Following his senior season, Heinicke was invited to play at the North/South All-Star Football Classic, where he collected 254 yards and three touchdowns en route to MVP honors after helping the North to a 22–0 victory over the South. He appeared on the reality TV show The Ride, which featured high school quarterbacks competing for a spot in the U.S. Army All-American Bowl.

College career
In 2011, Heinicke accepted an athletic scholarship to attend Old Dominion University (ODU), where he played for the Old Dominion Monarchs football team from 2011 to 2014. As a freshman, he led the Monarchs to a 10–3 record in the Colonial Athletic Association before losing in the second round of the FCS playoffs against Georgia Southern. He passed for 2,385 yards, 25 touchdowns, and 1 interception, and he ran for 363 yards and 4 touchdowns. He also punted 4 times for 170 yards. Heinicke was named to the All-CAA third-team and was the National Freshman Performer of the Year.

In 2012, Heinicke led the Monarchs to an 11–2 record, losing in the playoffs quarterfinals, again to Georgia Southern. That year, Heinicke passed for an FCS-record 5,076 yards, 44 touchdowns, and 14 interceptions. He ran for 470 yards and 11 touchdowns. He additionally punted 11 times for 475 yards. On September 22, 2012, against New Hampshire, Heinicke passed for a Division I-record 730 yards and threw five touchdowns. In 2012, Heinicke was awarded All-American honors, CAA Offensive Player of the Year, and the Walter Payton Award. Old Dominion finished ranked #6 in the FCS.

For the 2013 season, Old Dominion began a transition to Conference USA, meaning for the 2013 season, ODU was an independent team. Despite this, Heinicke led ODU to an 8–4 record against mostly FCS opponents. During the season, he passed for 4,022 yards, 33 touchdowns, and 8 interceptions. He ran for 348 yards and 5 touchdowns. He also punted 13 times for a total of 539 yards, also kicking the longest punt on the team for the season of 61 yards. During 2013, Heinicke became just the 18th quarterback from Division I to pass for 10,000 career yards and rush for 1,000. His 2013 season marks placed him in the top ten among FBS quarterbacks in passing yards, passing yards per game and touchdown passes.

For the 2014 season, Heinicke led ODU to a 6–6 record. During the season, he passed for 3,476 yards, 30 touchdowns, and 16 interceptions. He ran for 139 yards and two touchdowns. He also punted 14 times for a total of 661 yards.

College statistics

Professional career

Minnesota Vikings
Heinicke went undrafted in the 2015 NFL Draft, but signed with the Minnesota Vikings as an undrafted free agent. He competed against Mike Kafka to back up Vikings starting quarterback Teddy Bridgewater along with Shaun Hill. Kafka would get injured and was placed on injured reserve, making way for Heinicke to be the third string quarterback.

On September 3, 2016, Heinicke was placed on the reserve/NFI list with an off-the-field injury suffered between minicamp and training camp. He was activated to the active roster on November 8, 2016.

On September 2, 2017, Heinicke was waived/injured by the Vikings and was placed on the injured reserve. He was released with an injury settlement on September 11.

New England Patriots
On September 23, 2017, Heinicke was signed to the New England Patriots' practice squad. He was released on October 9, 2017.

Houston Texans 
On November 29, 2017, Heinicke was signed to the Houston Texans' practice squad. He was promoted to the active roster on December 15, 2017, to back up T. J. Yates following an injury to Tom Savage. On December 25, 2017, Heinicke made his NFL debut against the Pittsburgh Steelers after Yates suffered a possible concussion. However, after completing his only pass attempt, Heinicke suffered a concussion and was replaced by Yates, who had just passed the concussion protocol. On April 13, 2018, Heinicke was waived by the Texans.

Carolina Panthers
On April 16, 2018, Heinicke was claimed off waivers by the Carolina Panthers. During the 2018 season he appeared in six games with the Panthers including being named starter for Week 16 against the Atlanta Falcons after starter Cam Newton was ruled out for the remainder of the season with a shoulder injury. In his start against the Atlanta Falcons, Heinicke went 33 for 53 for 274 yards, a touchdown and three interceptions. During the game he suffered an elbow injury and was replaced by quarterback Kyle Allen. His injury was significant enough that he was placed on injured reserve for the Panthers final game of the year. Heinicke re-signed with the team on March 12, 2019, but was released during final roster cuts on August 30, 2019.

St. Louis BattleHawks
Heinicke was allocated to the St. Louis BattleHawks before the 2020 XFL Draft on November 22, 2019. However, he did not see the field during the season and recorded no statistics and had his contract terminated when the league suspended operations in April 2020 due to the COVID-19 pandemic.

Washington Football Team / Commanders

2020 season
On December 8, 2020, Heinicke signed with the practice squad of the Washington Football Team. Prior to joining them, he was in the process of finishing his engineering degree at Old Dominion. He was promoted to their active roster on December 19. He played his first game for the team in Week 16 against the Carolina Panthers after starting quarterback Dwayne Haskins was benched in the fourth quarter. Heinicke completed 12 of 19 passes for 137 yards and a touchdown during a 20–13 loss.

Heinicke started the team's Wild Card Round playoff game against the Tampa Bay Buccaneers after Alex Smith was ruled out due to injury. Heinicke completed 26 of 44 passes for 306 yards, threw a touchdown and an interception, and rushed for a touchdown in a 31–23 loss.

2021 season

An impending restricted free agent in 2021, Heinicke signed a two-year, $4.75 million contract extension with the team in February. In the season opener against the Los Angeles Chargers, he came in to relieve Ryan Fitzpatrick, who left in the second quarter with a hip injury. Heinicke was named the starter after Fitzpatrick was placed on injured reserve following the game. His first start came against the New York Giants in which he threw for 336 yards and two touchdowns in a 30–29 victory. He set an NFL record for the most completions by a quarterback in their first three starts with 93 after Week 2.

In Week 10 against the defending Super Bowl LV champion Buccaneers, Heinicke threw for 256 yards and a touchdown in a 29–19 upset win.  The next week, he played against his former team, the Panthers, and recorded 206 passing yards, 29 rushing yards, and three passing touchdowns in a 27–21 win. In the Week 14 loss against the Dallas Cowboys, Heinicke left the game in the fourth quarter after getting injured on a sack from defensive tackle Neville Gallimore. In the loss, he had 11 completions out of 25 pass attempts for 122 yards, one interception, and one touchdown. On December 17, 2021, Heinicke was placed on the team's COVID-19 reserve list and was forced to miss the Week 15 game against the Philadelphia Eagles. He was placed back on the active roster on December 23.

2022 season
At the start of the 2022 season, Heinicke was named the backup behind Carson Wentz. After Wentz was ruled out due to a fractured finger, head coach Ron Rivera named Heinicke as the starting quarterback in Week 7. In his season debut, Heinicke threw for 200 yards, two touchdowns, and one interception in the Commanders' 23-21 victory over the Green Bay Packers. Heinicke's nine-yard touchdown caught by Antonio Gibson in that game was the 3,000th touchdown in the franchise's history, and the ball was placed in the Pro Football Hall of Fame. In the following week, Heinicke completed 23 passes of 31 attempts for 279 yards, with one touchdown and one interception in a 17-16 win against the Indianapolis Colts. The next week, Heinicke threw for 149 yards, two touchdowns, and one interception, while adding 17 yards on the ground in a close loss at home to his former team, the Minnesota Vikings. In Week 16, Heinicke was benched in the fourth quarter with the San Francisco 49ers leading 30–14. He reverted back to the backup role after Wentz was reinstated as the team's starting quarterback before Week 17.

Atlanta Falcons
On March 16, 2023, Heinicke signed a two-year contract with the Atlanta Falcons.

Play style
During his time with Washington, Heinicke was known for his "underdog" mentality and the ability to lead the team to wins despite a perceived lack of size and natural arm talent.

NFL career statistics

Regular season

Postseason

References

External links
 Atlanta Falcons bio
 Old Dominion Monarchs bio

1993 births
Living people
American football quarterbacks
Old Dominion Monarchs football players
Players of American football from Atlanta
Walter Payton Award winners
Minnesota Vikings players
New England Patriots players
Houston Texans players
Carolina Panthers players
St. Louis BattleHawks players
Washington Commanders players
Washington Football Team players
Atlanta Falcons players